Igor Araújo may refer to:
Igor Araújo (footballer) (born 1987), Portuguese football goalkeeper
Igor Araújo (born 1980), Brazilian mixed martial artist